The canton of Sotteville-lès-Rouen is an administrative division of the Seine-Maritime department, in northern France. It was created at the French canton reorganisation which came into effect in March 2015. Its seat is in Sotteville-lès-Rouen.

It consists of the following communes:
Saint-Étienne-du-Rouvray (partly)
Sotteville-lès-Rouen (partly)

References

Cantons of Seine-Maritime